Dolichoderus  oviformis is an extinct species of Oligocene ant in the genus Dolichoderus. Described by Théobald in 1937, fossilised males and queens were found in France and have been described.

References

†
Oligocene insects
Prehistoric insects of Europe
Fossil taxa described in 1937
Fossil ant taxa
Fossils of France
 01